Namibia is scheduled to compete at the 2017 World Aquatics Championships in Budapest, Hungary from 14 July to 30 July.

Open water swimming

Namibia has entered two open water swimmers

Swimming

Namibia has received a Universality invitation from FINA to send three swimmers (two men and one woman) to the World Championships.

References

Nations at the 2017 World Aquatics Championships
2017
Aquatics Championships